Keystone High School is a public high school located in LaGrange, Ohio, southwest of Cleveland in Lorain County, Ohio. A new high school was built and opened in August, 2006.

The school's primary color is purple, with secondary colors of white and gray. The school's mascot is the Wildcat. The school is a member of the Lorain County League. The tune of the alma mater is Far Above Cayuga's Waters; the fight song, On Wisconsin.

Ohio High School Athletic Association State Championships
 Girls Softball - 1999, 2006, 2012, 2018, 2021

Link
keystonelocalschools.org|District Website

Notes and references

High schools in Lorain County, Ohio
Public high schools in Ohio